Colobothea seriatomaculata is a species of beetle in the family Cerambycidae. It was described by Dmytro Zajciw in 1962. It is known from Argentina, Brazil and Paraguay.

References

seriatomaculata
Beetles described in 1962